His Majesty's Advocate General for Scotland is one of the Law Officers of the Crown, whose duty it is to advise the Crown and His Majesty's Government on Scots law. The Office of the Advocate General for Scotland is a ministerial department of His Majesty's Government. The position is currently held by Lord Stewart of Dirleton.

History
The office of Advocate General for Scotland was created in 1999 by the Scotland Act 1998 to be the chief legal adviser to the United Kingdom Government on Scots law. This function had previously been carried out by the Lord Advocate and Solicitor General for Scotland, who were transferred to the Scottish Government on the establishment of the Scottish Parliament. The office of the Advocate General for Scotland should not be confused with that of "His Majesty's Advocate", which is the term used for the Lord Advocate in Scottish criminal proceedings.

List of Advocates General for Scotland

The first holder of the office was Lynda Clark, then Member of Parliament for Edinburgh Pentlands and from 2005 a member of the House of Lords as Baroness Clark of Calton. On 18 January 2006, Baroness Clark resigned to take up office as a Senator of the College of Justice, a judge of the Supreme Courts of Scotland.

The office was then vacant until 15 March of that year when, under section 87 of the Scotland Act 1998, its functions were temporarily conferred on the Secretary of State for Scotland, Alastair Darling MP, himself a Scottish advocate.

There had been substantial criticism from the judiciary and others of the length of time the office had been left vacant. On 21 March, however, it was announced Neil Davidson, former Solicitor General for Scotland, had been appointed Advocate General. He was created a life peer, as Baron Davidson of Glen Clova, on 22 March 2006.

On 14 May 2010, Jim Wallace, Baron Wallace of Tankerness, a former Deputy First Minister of Scotland, was appointed by the coalition government.

Richard Keen was appointed Advocate General in David Cameron's majority government on 29 May 2015, and has retained the post through two subsequent prime ministers to 2020. He was created a life peer, as Baron Keen of Elie, on 8 June 2015. He resigned on 16 September 2020 citing concerns arising from the UK Internal Market Bill, noting in his letter of resignation to Boris Johnson that he found it "increasingly difficult to reconcile what I consider to be my obligations as a Law Officer with your policy intentions".

Keith Stewart was appointed to succeed Keen on 15 October 2020.

Organisation

The office has a staff of around 40.

All staff are on secondment or loan from other government organisations, mainly the Scottish Government and the Ministry of Justice.

Offices of the Advocate General

Advocate General's Private Office, based in London
Legal Secretariat to the Advocate General (LSAG), based in London
Legal Secretary to the Advocate General
Office of the Advocate General (OAG), based in Edinburgh
Solicitor to the Advocate General
 Head of Litigation Division (Scots law)
 Head of Advisory & Legislation Division (Primary legislation, subordinate legislation, Scotland Act draft orders)
 Head of HMRC Division

See also
 Advocate General
 Lord Advocate
 Attorney General for England and Wales

Notes

References

External links

 
1999 establishments in Scotland
Scotland
Scots law formal titles
1999 in British law